Edward's Ford Bridge, also known as Bridge #17, is a historic stone arch bridge located on the grounds of Jefferson Proving Ground in Campbell Township, Jennings County, Indiana.  It was built in 1911, and is a three-span, round arch bridge.  It is 194 feet in length and 17 feet wide.  It was rehabilitated in 1986.

It was listed on the National Register of Historic Places in 1996.

References

Road bridges on the National Register of Historic Places in Indiana
Bridges completed in 1911
Transportation buildings and structures in Jennings County, Indiana
National Register of Historic Places in Jennings County, Indiana
Stone arch bridges in the United States